Arminianism is a branch of Protestantism initiated in the early 16th century, based on the theological ideas of the Dutch Reformed theologian Jacobus Arminius and his historic supporters known as Remonstrants. Dutch Arminianism was originally articulated in the Remonstrance (1610), a theological statement submitted to the States General of the Netherlands. This expressed an attempt to moderate the doctrines of Calvinism related to its interpretation of predestination.

Classical Arminianism, to which Arminius is the main contributor, and Wesleyan Arminianism, to which John Wesley is the main contributor, are the two main schools of thought. Central Arminian beliefs are that God's preparing grace to regeneration is universal, and that God's justifying grace allowing regeneration is resistible.

Many Christian denominations have been influenced by Arminian views, notably the Baptists in 17th century, the Methodists in the 18th century, and the Pentecostals in the 20th century.

History

Precursor movements and theological influences 
According to Roger E. Olson, Arminius’ beliefs, i.e. Arminianism, did not begin with him. Denominations such as the Waldensians and other groups prior to the Reformation have similarly to Arminianism affirmed that each person may choose the contingent response of either resisting God's grace or yielding to it. Anabaptist theologian Balthasar Hubmaier also promoted much the same view as Arminius nearly a century before him. The soteriological doctrines of Arminianism and Anabaptism are roughly equivalent. In particular, Mennonites have been historically Arminian whether they distinctly espoused the Arminian viewpoint or not, and rejected Calvinism soteriology. Anabaptist theology seems to have influenced Jacobus Arminius. At least, he was "sympathetic to the Anabaptist point of view, and Anabaptists were commonly in attendance on his preaching." Similarly, Arminius mentions Danish Lutheran theologian Niels Hemmingsen as holding the basic view of soteriology he held and he may have been influenced by Hemmingsen.

Emergence of Arminianism

Jacobus Arminius was a Dutch pastor and theologian in the late 16th and early 17th centuries. He was taught by Theodore Beza, Calvin's hand-picked successor, but after examination of the scriptures, he rejected his teacher's theology that it is God who unconditionally elects some for salvation. Instead Arminius proposed that the election of God was of believers, thereby making it conditional on faith. Arminius's views were challenged by the Dutch Calvinists, especially Franciscus Gomarus, but Arminius died before a national synod could occur.

Arminius died before he could satisfy Holland's State General's request for a 14-page paper outlining his views. Arminius's followers replied in his stead crafting the Five articles of Remonstrance (1610), in which they express their points of divergence with the stricter Calvinism of the Belgic Confession. This is how Arminius's followers were called Remonstrants, and following a Counter Remonstrance in 1611, Gomarus' followers were called Counter-Remonstrants.

After some political maneuvering, the Dutch Calvinists were able to convince Prince Maurice of Nassau to deal with the situation. Maurice systematically removed Arminian magistrates from office and called a national synod at Dordrecht. This Synod of Dort was open primarily to Dutch Calvinists (102 people), while the Arminians were excluded (13 people banned from voting), with Calvinist representatives from other countries (28 people), and in 1618 published a condemnation of Arminius and his followers as heretics. Part of this publication was the famous Five points of Calvinism in response to the five articles of Remonstrance.

Arminians across Holland were removed from office, imprisoned, banished, and sworn to silence. Twelve years later Holland officially granted Arminianism protection as a religion, although animosity between Arminians and Calvinists continued. Most of the early Remonstrants followed a classical version of Arminianism. However, some of them such as Philipp van Limborch, moved in the direction of semi-Pelagianism and rationalism.

Arminianism in the Church of England

In England, the so-labelled Arminian doctrines were held, in substance, before and in parallel of Arminius. The Thirty-nine Articles of Religion (finalised in 1571), were sufficiently ambiguous that they were compatible with either Arminian or Calvinistic interpretations. Arminianism in the Church of England was fundamentally an expression of negation of Calvinism, and only some theologians held to classical Arminianism, but for the rest they were either semi-Pelagian or Pelagian. In this specific context, contemporary historians prefer to use the term "proto-Arminians" rather than "Arminians" to designate the leanings of divines who didn't follow classical Arminianism. English Arminianism was represented by Arminian Puritans such as John Goodwin or High Anglican Arminians such as Jeremy Taylor and Henry Hammond. Anglican Arminians of the 17th century such as William Laud fought Calvinist Puritans. They actually saw Arminianism in terms of a state church, idea that was completely alien to the views of Arminius. This position became particularly evident under the reign (1625-1649) of Charles I of England. Following the English Civil War (1642–1651) Charles II of England, who tolerated the Presbyterians, re-instituted Arminian thought in the Church of England. It was dominant there for some fifty years, and mostly after the Restoration (1660).

Baptists
The debate between Calvin's followers and Arminius's followers is characteristic of post-Reformation church history. The emerging Baptist movement in 17th-century England, for example, was a microcosm of the historic debate between Calvinists and Arminians. The first Baptists—called "General Baptists" because of their confession of a "general" or unlimited atonement—were Arminians. The Baptist movement originated with Thomas Helwys, who left his mentor John Smyth (who had moved into shared belief and other distinctives of the Dutch Waterlander Mennonites of Amsterdam) and returned to London to start the first English Baptist Church in 1611. Later General Baptists such as John Griffith, Samuel Loveday, and Thomas Grantham defended a Reformed Arminian theology that reflected the Arminianism of Arminius. The General Baptists encapsulated their Arminian views in numerous confessions, the most influential of which was the Standard Confession of 1660. In the 1640s the Particular Baptists were formed, diverging strongly from Arminian doctrine and embracing the strong Calvinism of the Presbyterians and Independents. Their robust Calvinism was publicized in such confessions as the London Baptist Confession of 1644 and the Second London Confession of 1689. The London Confession of 1689 was later used by Calvinistic Baptists in America (called the Philadelphia Baptist Confession), whereas the Standard Confession of 1660 was used by the American heirs of the English General Baptists, who soon came to be known as Free Will Baptists.

Methodists
This same dynamic between Arminianism and Calvinism can be seen in the heated discussions between friends and fellow Anglican ministers John Wesley and George Whitefield. Wesley was highly influenced by 17th-century English Arminianism and thinkers such as John Goodwin, Jeremy Taylor and Henry Hammond of the Anglican "Holy Living" school, and the Remonstrant Hugo Grotius. Wesley knew very little about the beliefs of Jacobus Arminius and arrived at his religious views independently of Arminius. Wesley acknowledged late in life, with the 1778 publication of a periodical titled The Arminian, that he and Arminius were in general agreement. Theology Professor W. Stephen Gunther concludes he was "a faithful representative" of Arminius' beliefs. Wesley was a champion of Arminian teachings, defending his soteriology in The Arminian and writing articles such as Predestination Calmly Considered. He defended Arminianism against charges of semi-Pelagianism, holding strongly to beliefs in original sin and total depravity. At the same time, Wesley attacked the determinism that he claimed characterized Calvinistic doctrines of unconditional election and reprobation and maintained a belief in the ability to lose salvation. Wesley also clarified the doctrine of prevenient grace and preached the ability of Christians to attain to perfection (fully mature, not "sinlessness"). His system of thought has become known as Wesleyan Arminianism, the foundations of which were laid by Wesley and his fellow preacher John William Fletcher.

Pentecostals 
Pentecostalism has its background in the activity of Charles Parham (1873–1929). Its origin as a movement was in the Azusa Street Revival in Los Angeles in 1906. This revival was led by William J. Seymour (1870–1922). Due to the Methodist and Holiness background of many early Pentecostal preachers, the Pentecostal churches usually possessed practices that arose from the Wesleyan Arminianism. During the 20th century, as Pentecostal churches began to settle and incorporate more standard forms, they started to formulate theology that was fully Arminian. Currently, the two largest Pentecostal denominations in the world, the Assemblies of God and the Pentecostal Church of God denominations, hold officially to Arminian views such as resistible grace, conditional election, or conditional security of the believer for the first.

Current landscape

Protestant denominations 
Advocates of Arminianism find a home in many Protestant denominations, and sometimes other beliefs such as Calvinism exist within the same denomination. The Lutheran theological tradition bears certain similarities to Arminianism and there may be some Lutheran churches that are open to it. Faiths leaning at least in part in the Arminian direction include some of high-church Anglicanism. Anabaptist denominations, such as the Mennonites, Hutterites, Amish and Schwarzenau Brethren, adhere to Anabaptist theology, which espouses a soteriology that is similar to Arminianism "in some respects". Arminianism is found within the General Baptists, including the subset of General Baptists known as Free Will Baptists. The majority of Southern Baptists accept Arminianism, with an exception allowing for a doctrine of eternal security, though many see Calvinism as growing in acceptance. Certain proponents of Arminianism may be found within the Restoration movement in the Christian Churches and Churches of Christ. Additionally, it is found in the Seventh-day Adventist Church. Arminianism (specifically Wesleyan–Arminian theology) is taught in the Methodist churches, inclusive of those denominations aligned with the holiness movement such as the Evangelical Methodist Church, Church of the Nazarene, the Free Methodist Church, the Wesleyan Church, and the Salvation Army. It is also found in a part of the Charismatics, including the Pentecostals.

Scholarly support 
The current scholarly support for Arminianism is varied: Among Baptist theologians, Roger E. Olson, F. Leroy Forlines, Robert Picirilli, and J. Matthew Pinson are four supporters of a return to the teachings of Arminius. Methodist theologian Thomas Oden, "Evangelical Methodists" Bible scholar Ben Witherington III, and Christian apologist David Pawson are generally Arminian in their theologies. Holiness movement theologians Henry Orton Wiley, Carl O. Bangs and J. Kenneth Grider can also be mentioned among recent proponents of Arminianism. Various other theologians or Bible scholars as B. J. Oropeza, Keith D. Stanglin, Craig S. Keener, Thomas H. McCall, and Grant R. Osborne can be mentioned as well.

Theology

Theological legacy 
The original beliefs of Jacobus Arminius are commonly called Arminianism, but more broadly, the term may embrace the teachings of Simon Episcopius, Hugo Grotius, John Wesley, and others. Arminian theology usually falls into one of two groups: Classical Arminianism, drawn from the teaching of Jacobus Arminius, and Wesleyan Arminian, drawing primarily from Wesley. The two groups overlap substantially.

In 529, at the Second Council of Orange, the question at hand was whether the doctrines of Augustine on God's providence were to be affirmed, or if semi-Pelagianism could be affirmed. Semi-Pelagianism was a moderate form of Pelagianism that teaches that the first step of salvation is by human will and not the grace of God. The determination of the Council could be considered "semi-Augustinian". It defined that faith, though a free act of man, resulted, even in its beginnings, from the grace of God, enlightening the human mind and enabling belief. This describes the operation of prevenient grace allowing the unregenerate to repent in faith. On the other hand, the Council of Orange condemned the Augustinian teaching of predestination to damnation. Since Arminianism is aligned with those characteristic semi-Augustinian views it has been seen by some as a reclamation of early church theological consensus. Moreover, Arminianism can also be seen as a soteriological diversification of Calvinism or more specifically, as a theological middle ground between Calvinism and semi-Pelagianism.

Classical Arminianism

Classical Arminianism is the theological system that was presented by Jacobus Arminius and maintained by some of the Remonstrants. Theologians as Forlines and Olson have referred to this system as "classical Arminianism", while others as Picirilli and Pinson prefer to term it "Reformation Arminianism" or "Reformed Arminianism". 

The teachings of Arminius held to Sola fide and Sola gratia of the Reformation, but they were distinct from particular teachings of Martin Luther, Huldrych Zwingli, John Calvin, and other Protestant Reformers.

Classical Arminianism was originally articulated in the Five Articles of Remonstrance. "These points", note Keith D. Stanglin and Thomas H. McCall, "are consistent with the views of Arminius; indeed, some come verbatim from his Declaration of Sentiments." A list of beliefs of classical Arminianism is given below:

God's providence and human free will 
The majority Arminian view accepts classical theism, which states that God is omnipresent, omnipotent, and omniscient. In that view, God's power, knowledge, and presence have no external limitations, that is, outside of his divine nature and character.

Besides, Arminianism view on God's sovereignty is based on postulates stemming from God's character, especially as fully revealed in Jesus Christ. On the first hand, divine election must be defined in such a way that God is not in any case, and even in a secondary way, the author of evil. It would not correspond to the character of God. On the other hand, man's responsibility for evil must be absolutely preserved. Those two postulates require a specific way by which God chooses to manifest his sovereignty when interacting with his creatures:

On one hand, it requires for God to operate according to a limited mode of providence. This means that God purposely exercises his sovereignty in ways that do not illustrate the full extent of his omnipotence. On the other hand, it requires for God's election to be a "predestination by foreknowledge".

In that respect, God's foreknowledge reconciles with human free will in the following way: Human free will is limited by original sin, though God's prevenient grace restores to humanity the ability to accept God's call of salvation. God's foreknowledge of the future is exhaustive and complete, and therefore the future is certain and not contingent on human action. God does not determine the future, but He does know it. God's certainty and human contingency are compatible.

Roger Olson expressed those defining ideas in a more practical way:""Arminianism," [...] is simply a term we use in theology for the view, held by some people before Arminius and many after him, that sinners who hear the gospel have the free will to accept or reject God’s offer of saving grace and that nobody is excluded by God from the possibility of salvation except those who freely exclude themselves. But true, historical, classical Arminianism includes the belief that this free will [to repent and believe unto salvation] is itself a gift of God through prevenient grace."

Condition of humanity 
Depravity is total: Arminius states "In this [fallen] state, the free will of man towards the true good is not only wounded, infirm, bent, and weakened; but it is also imprisoned, destroyed, and lost. And its powers are not only debilitated and useless unless they be assisted by grace, but it has no powers whatever except such as are excited by Divine grace."

Extent and nature of the atonement 
Atonement is intended for all: Jesus's death was for all people, Jesus draws all people to himself, and all people have opportunity for salvation through faith.

Jesus's death satisfies God's justice: The penalty for the sins of the elect is paid in full through the crucifixion of Christ. Thus Christ's death atones for the sins of all, but requires faith to be effected. Arminius states that "Justification, when used for the act of a Judge, is either purely the imputation of righteousness through mercy [...] or that man is justified before God [...] according to the rigor of justice without any forgiveness." Stephen Ashby clarifies: "Arminius allowed for only two possible ways in which the sinner might be justified: (1) by our absolute and perfect adherence to the law, or (2) purely by God's imputation of Christ's righteousness." W. Stephen Gunter concurs that Arminius would not take a rigid position on the doctrine of imputed righteousness (the righteousness of Christ is imputed for righteousness of the believer). For Keith D. Stanglin and Thomas H. McCall, Arminius would not object to saying rather that "the righteousness of Christ is imputed to righteousness". Forlines put it this way: "On the condition of faith, we are placed in union with Christ. Based on that union, we receive His death and righteousness".

Christ's atonement has a substitutionary effect which is limited only to the elect. Arminius held that God's justice was satisfied by penal substitution. Hugo Grotius taught that it was satisfied governmentally. According to Roger Olson, historical and contemporary Arminians have held to one of these views.

Conversion of man 
Grace is resistible: God takes initiative in the salvation process and his grace comes to all people. This grace (often called pre-regenerating or prevenient grace) acts on all people to convince them of the Gospel, draw them strongly towards salvation, and enable the possibility of sincere faith. Picirilli states that "indeed this grace is so close to regeneration that it inevitably leads to regeneration unless finally resisted." The offer of salvation through grace does not act irresistibly in a purely cause-effect, deterministic method but rather in an influence-and-response fashion that can be both freely accepted and freely denied.

Man has a freed will to respond or resist: Free will is granted and limited by God's sovereignty, but God's sovereignty allows all men the choice to accept the Gospel of Jesus through faith, simultaneously allowing all men to resist.

Conversion is synergistic: As Roger Olson put it: "[Arminius]' evangelical synergism reserves all the power, ability and efficacy in salvation to grace, but allows humans the God-granted ability to resist or not resist it. The only "contribution" humans make is nonresistance to grace."

Election of man 
Election is conditional: Arminius defined election as "the decree of God by which, of Himself, from eternity, He decreed to justify in Christ, believers, and to accept them unto eternal life." God alone determines who will be saved and his determination is that all who believe Jesus through faith will be justified. According to Arminius, "God regards no one in Christ unless they are engrafted in him by faith."

God predestines the elect to a glorious future: Predestination is not the predetermination of who will believe, but rather the predetermination of the believer's future inheritance. The elect are therefore predestined to sonship through adoption, glorification, and eternal life.

Preservation of man 
Related to eschatological considerations, Jacobus Arminius and the first Remonstrants, including Simon Episcopius believed in everlasting fire where the wicked are thrown by God at judgment day.

Preservation is conditional: All believers have full assurance of salvation with the condition that they remain in Christ. Salvation is conditioned on faith, therefore perseverance is also conditioned. Arminius believed the Scriptures taught that believers are graciously empowered by Christ and the Holy Spirit "to fight against Satan, sin, the world and their own flesh, and to gain the victory over these enemies." Furthermore, Christ and the Spirit are ever present to aid and assist believers through various temptations. But this security was not unconditional but conditional—"provided they [believers] stand prepared for the battle, implore his help, and be not wanting to themselves, Christ preserves them from falling."

Possibility of apostasy 
Arminius believed in the possibility for a believer to commit apostasy (i.e., desert Christ by cleaving again to this evil world, losing a good conscience, or by failing to hold on to sound doctrine). However, over the period of time Arminius wrote on this question, he sometimes expressed himself more cautiously out of consideration for the faith of his readers. For instance, Arminius declared in 1599 that this matter required further study in the Scriptures. Arminius said also in his "Declaration of Sentiments" (1607), "I never taught that a true believer can, either totally or finally fall away from the faith, and perish; yet I will not conceal, that there are passages of scripture which seem to me to wear this aspect; and those answers to them which I have been permitted to see, are not of such a kind as to approve themselves on all points to my understanding."

But in his other writings he expressed certainty about the possibility of falling away: Arminius wrote in ca. 1602, that "a person who is being 'built' into the church of Christ may resist the continuation of this process". Concerning the believers he said "It may suffice to encourage them, if they know that no power or prudence can dislodge them from the rock, unless they of their own will forsake their position." He continued by saying that the covenant of God (Jeremiah 23) "does not contain in itself an impossibility of defection from God, but a promise of the gift of fear, whereby they shall be hindered from going away from God so long as that shall flourish in their hearts." He then taught that had King David died in his sins he would have been lost. In 1602, Arminius also wrote: "A believing member of Christ may become slothful, give place to sin, and gradually die altogether, ceasing to be a member".

For Arminius, certain class of sin would cause a believer to fall, especially sin motivated by malice. In 1605 Arminius wrote: “But it is possible for a believer to fall into a mortal sin, as is seen in David. Therefore he can fall at that moment in which if he were to die, he would be condemned". Stanglin, along with McCall, point out that Arminius clearly sets forth two paths to apostasy 1. "rejection", or 2. "malicious sinning". Oropeza concludes: "If there is any consistency in Arminius' position, he did not seem to deny the possibility of falling away". 

After the death of Arminius in 1609, his followers wrote a Remonstrance (1610) based quite literally on their leader's "Declaration of Sentiments" (1607) which expressed prudence on the possibility of apostasy. In particular, its fifth article expressed the necessity of further study on the possibility of apostasy. Sometime between 1610 and the official proceeding of the Synod of Dort (1618), the Remonstrants became fully persuaded in their minds that the Scriptures taught that a true believer was capable of falling away from faith and perishing eternally as an unbeliever. They formalized their views in "The Opinion of the Remonstrants" (1618) which was their official stand during the Synod of Dort. Picirilli remarks: "Ever since that early period, then, when the issue was being examined again, Arminians have taught that those who are truly saved need to be warned against apostasy as a real and possible danger." They later expressed this same view in the Remonstrant Confession (1621).

Forgivability of apostasy 
Stanglin points out that Arminius held that if the apostasy came from "malicious" sin, then it was forgivable. If it came from "rejection" it was not. Following Arminius, the Remonstrants believed that, though possible, apostasy was not in general irremediable. However, other classical Arminians as the Free Will Baptists have taught that apostasy is irremediable.

Wesleyan Arminianism

John Wesley thoroughly agreed with the vast majority of what Arminius himself taught. Wesleyan Arminianism is classical Arminianism with the addition of Wesleyan perfectionism. Here are mentioned some positions on specific issues within Wesleyan Arminianism:

Nature of the atonement 
Steven Harper proposed that Wesley's atonement is a hybrid of the penal substitution theory and the governmental theory. However, theologians as Robert Picirilli, Roger Olson and Darren Cushman Wood consider that the view of Wesley concerning atonement is by penal substitution. Wesleyan Arminians have historically adopted either penal or governmental theory of the atonement.

Preservation and apostasy of man 
Wesley fully accepted the Arminian view that genuine Christians could apostatize and lose their salvation, as his famous sermon "A Call to Backsliders" clearly demonstrates. Harper summarizes as follows: "the act of committing sin is not in itself ground for the loss of salvation [...] the loss of salvation is much more related to experiences that are profound and prolonged. Wesley sees two primary pathways that could result in a permanent fall from grace: unconfessed sin and the actual expression of apostasy." Wesley believed that such apostasy was not irremediable. When talking about those who have made "shipwreck" of their faith,(1 Tim 1:19) Wesley claims that "not one, or a hundred only, but I am persuaded, several thousands [...] innumerable are the instances [...] of those who had fallen but now stand upright."

Christian perfection 
One issue that typify Wesleyan Arminianism is Christian perfection. According to Wesley's teaching, Christians could attain a state of practical perfection, meaning a lack of all voluntary sin by the empowerment of the Holy Spirit, in this life. Christian perfection (or entire sanctification), according to Wesley, is "purity of intention, dedicating all the life to God" and "the mind which was in Christ, enabling us to walk as Christ walked." It is "loving God with all our heart, and our neighbor as ourselves". It is "a restoration not only to the favour, but likewise to the image of God," our "being filled with the fullness of God". Wesley was clear that Christian perfection did not imply perfection of bodily health or an infallibility of judgment. It also does not mean we no longer violate the will of God, for involuntary transgressions remain. Perfected Christians remain subject to temptation, and have continued need to pray for forgiveness and holiness. It is not an absolute perfection but a perfection in love. Furthermore, Wesley did not teach a salvation by perfection, but rather says that, "Even perfect holiness is acceptable to God only through Jesus Christ."

Other variations

Corporate view of election

The majority Arminian view is that election is individual and based on God's foreknowledge of faith. According to the corporate election view, God never chose individuals to elect to salvation, but rather He chose to elect the believing church to salvation. Corporate election draws support from a similar concept of corporate election found in the Old Testament and Jewish law. Indeed most biblical scholarship is in agreement that Judeo-Greco-Roman thought in the 1st century was opposite of the Western world's "individual first" mantra. Identity stemmed from membership in a group more than individuality. Supporters of corporate election hold to covenant theology: As a result of the new covenant, God's chosen people are now the corporate body of Christ, the church. These supporters also maintain that Jesus was the only human ever elected and that individuals must be "in Christ" through faith to be part of the elect.

Arminianism and other views

Divergence with Pelagianism

Pelagianism is a doctrine denying original sin and total depravity. No system of Arminianism founded on Arminius or Wesley denies original sin or total depravity; both Arminius and Wesley strongly affirmed that man's basic condition is one in which he cannot be righteous, understand God, or seek God. Arminius referred to Pelagianism as "the grand falsehood" and stated that he "must confess that I detest, from my heart, the consequences [of that theology]." David Pawson, a British pastor, decries this association as "libelous" when attributed to Arminius' or Wesley's doctrine. Indeed, most Arminians reject all accusations of Pelagianism.

Divergence with semi-Pelagianism 
Some schools of thought, notably semi-Pelagianism, which teaches that the first step of Salvation is by human will, are confused as being Arminian in nature. But classical Arminianism and Wesleyan Arminianism hold that the first step of Salvation is through the prevenient grace of God, though "the subsequent grace entails a cooperative relationship."

Divergence with Calvinism
The two systems of Calvinism and Arminianism share both history and many doctrines, and the history of Christian theology. However, because of their differences over the doctrines of divine predestination and election, many people view these schools of thought as opposed to each other. The distinction is whether God desires to save all yet allows individuals to resist the grace offered (in the Arminian doctrine) or if God desires to save only some and grace is irresistible to those chosen (in the Calvinist doctrine). Many consider the theological differences to be crucial differences in doctrine, while others find them to be relatively minor.

Similarities
 Total depravity – Arminians agree with Calvinists over the doctrine of total depravity. The differences come in the understanding of how God remedies this human depravity.

Differences
 Nature of election – Arminians hold that election to eternal salvation has the condition of faith attached. The Calvinist doctrine of unconditional election states that salvation cannot be earned or achieved and is therefore not conditional upon any human effort, so faith is not a condition of salvation but the divinely apportioned means to it. In other words, Arminians believe that they owe their election to their faith, whereas Calvinists believe that they owe their faith to their election.
 Nature of grace – Arminians believe that, through grace, God restores free will concerning salvation to all humanity, and each individual, therefore, is able either to accept the Gospel call through faith or resist it through unbelief. Calvinists hold that God's grace to enable salvation is given only to the elect and irresistibly leads to salvation.
 Extent of the atonement – Arminians, along with four-point Calvinists or Amyraldians, hold to a universal atonement instead of the Calvinist doctrine that atonement is limited to the elect only. Both sides (with the exception of hyper-Calvinists) believe the invitation of the gospel is universal and "must be presented to everyone [they] can reach without any distinction." 
 Perseverance in faith – Arminians believe that future salvation and eternal life is secured in Christ and protected from all external forces but is conditional on remaining in Christ and can be lost through apostasy. Traditional Calvinists believe in the doctrine of the perseverance of the saints, which says that because God chose some unto salvation and actually paid for their particular sins, he keeps them from apostasy and that those who do apostatize were never truly regenerated (that is, born again) or saved. Non-traditional Calvinists and other evangelicals advocate the similar but distinct doctrine of eternal security that teaches if a person was once saved, his or her salvation can never be in jeopardy, even if the person completely apostatizes.

Divergence with open theism
The doctrine of open theism states that God is omnipresent, omnipotent, and omniscient, but differs on the nature of the future. Open theists claim that the future is not completely determined (or "settled") because people have not made their free decisions yet. God therefore knows the future partially in possibilities (human free actions) rather than solely certainties (divinely determined events). Some Arminians, such as professor and theologian Robert Picirilli, reject the doctrine of open theism as a "deformed Arminianism". Joseph Dongell stated that "open theism actually moves beyond classical Arminianism towards process theology." There are also some Arminians, like Roger Olson, who believe Open theism to be an alternative view that a Christian can have.

See also 
 Covenant theology
 Salvation in Christianity
 Grace in Christianity
 Sovereignty of God in Christianity
 Order of salvation
 Substitutionary atonement
 Satisfaction theory
 Penal theory
 Governmental theory
 Justification
 Free will in theology
 Decisional regeneration
 Synergism
 Apostasy in Christianity

Notes and references

Sources

 
 
 
 
 
 
 
 
 
 
 
 
 
 
 
 
 
 
 
 
 
 
 
 
 
 
 
 
 
 
 
 
 
 
 
 
 
 
 
 
 
 
 
 
 
 
 
 
 
 
 .

Further reading

External links
 The Society of Evangelical Arminians

 
17th-century Calvinism
Calvinism in the Dutch Republic
Christian terminology
Christian theological movements
Jacobus Arminius
Methodism
Philosophy and thought in the Dutch Republic
Protestant theology
Seventh-day Adventist theology